Burnside Township was a township in Goodhue County, Minnesota, United States until June 1, 1971, when the city of Red Wing annexed the township's entirety.

History 
Burnside Township was settled in 1854 and organized in 1858, known first as Union, then Milton from 1859 to 1861, then was renamed as Burnside in 1861, in honor of Ambrose E. Burnside. The ghost town of Burnside was settled in 1853, and became part of Prairie Island Indian Community in 1908.

Today, several places named Burnside exist within the city of Red Wing, including Burnside Cemetery and Burnside School.

Notes 

Defunct townships in Minnesota
Neighborhoods in Minnesota
Geography of Goodhue County, Minnesota
Red Wing, Minnesota
Populated places established in 1854
1854 establishments in Minnesota Territory
Populated places disestablished in 1971
1971 disestablishments in Minnesota